The Cessna Citation is a family of business jets by Cessna that started in 1972 with the entry into service of the first model. In the fifty years following the 1969 first flight, more than 7,500 Citations were delivered, forming the largest business jet fleet. Deliveries reached 8,000 by 2022, while logging over 41 million flight hours.

The line started with the small Citation I prototype flying on September 15, 1969, and produced until 1985, developed into the 1978-2006 Citation II/Bravo, the 1989-2011 Citation V/Ultra/Encore and the CitationJet since 1993.
The standup Citation III/VI/VII was delivered from 1983 to 2000; its fuselage was reused in the Citation X/X+ delivered from 1996 to 2018, the Sovereign from 2004 to 2021 and the Excel since 1998.
The Mustang was a Very Light Jet delivered from 2006 to 2017 while the flat floor fuselage Latitude has been delivered since 2015 and the larger Longitude from 2019.

The aircraft are named after Citation, a champion American Thoroughbred racehorse who won the American Triple Crown.

Lineage

Models

Citation I

Citation II/Bravo

Citation III/IV/VI/VII

Citation V/Ultra/Encore

CitationJet

CitationJet (trainer)

The Model 526 CitationJet was a twin-engine, two-seat tandem military trainer developed from the Model 525 as a candidate for the Joint Primary Aircraft Training System competition (JPATS). The two models share 75% of their parts, including wing, engines, landing gear, and other systems. First flown in December 1993, the 526 did not succeed at the JPATS contest, and only two examples were built in total.

Citation X/X+

Excel/XLS/XLS+

Sovereign

Mustang

Columbus

Latitude

Longitude

Hemisphere

Current Models

See also

References

Notes

External links

Cessna Citation home page
 

 

United States civil aircraft
United States business aircraft
Twinjets
Low-wing aircraft
Aircraft first flown in 1969